Lantan Lake or Orchid Lake is a lake and reservoir in East District, Chiayi City, Taiwan.

History
The lake is also called the Holland Lake, Dutch Lake, and Hong-Mao Pei (see ang mo) because the lake was dug by the Dutch around 300 years ago during the Dutch Formosa rule by taking it source from the Bazhang River to irrigate the broad fields run by the Dutch East India Company. This system lasted until the beginning of Kingdom of Tungning in Taiwan in which the lake laid in ruins until the Qing Dynasty rule. In the late Japanese rule period, the dam was reconstructed.

Geography
The reservoir can contain 9,790,000 m3 of water as the main water resource of Chiayi City. It covers an area of 2 km2.

Features
A fountain is set up on the lake with water surging up to 50 meters.

Transportation
The lake is accessible by Chiayi City Bus route 1 and route 66 from Chiayi Station of Taiwan Railways.

See also
 Geography of Taiwan

References

East District, Chiayi
Lakes of Taiwan
Landforms of Chiayi